Yuma is an unincorporated community in Carroll County, Tennessee, United States. Yuma has a post office, with Zip code 38390.

Demographics

Notes

Unincorporated communities in Carroll County, Tennessee
Unincorporated communities in Tennessee